Leonard Krawcheck (born January 20, 1941) was an American politician in the state of South Carolina. He served in the South Carolina House of Representatives from 1967 to 1970, representing Charleston County, South Carolina. He is a lawyer.

References

1941 births
Living people
Politicians from Charleston, South Carolina
Members of the South Carolina House of Representatives
Lawyers from Charleston, South Carolina